Paul Katema may refer to:
 Paul Katema (politician)
 Paul Katema (footballer)